Quintus Fabius Maximus Rullianus (or Rullus), son of Marcus Fabius Ambustus, of the patrician Fabii of ancient Rome, was five times consul and a hero of the Samnite Wars. He was brother to Marcus Fabius Ambustus (magister equitum 322 BC).

His first appearance in surviving records is as magister equitum in 325 BC, when he won a daring victory against the Samnites at Imbrinium. However, he had acted without the authority of the dictator Lucius Papirius Cursor, who was angry and demanded that the Senate punish Fabius for disobeying orders.  Livy (8.31-36) describes a tense scene where Papirius stood nearly alone against the Senate and people, who supported Fabius because of his victory, but who also did not wish to undercut the absolute authority they had given Papirius; finally Fabius threw himself at the feet of the dictator and asked forgiveness, which was granted.

Fabius became consul for the first time in 322 BC, although little is said of his time in office. He appears next as a dictator himself in 315 BC, successfully besieging Saticula and then, less successfully, fighting at Lautulae (Diodorus mentions another dictatorship in 313 BC, but this is probably mistaken). As consul in 310 BC, Fabius fought the Etruscans at Sutrium, then followed them when they fled into the Ciminian Forest and defeated them again. Consul again in 308 BC, he defeated Perusia and Nuceria Alfaterna.

He then served as censor beginning in 304 BC.

Fabius was consul for the fourth time in 297 BC, defeating the Samnites at Tifernum by sending part of his line around the hills behind the enemy, and in 295 BC he was elected unanimously for a fifth term, where he won lasting fame for defeating a coalition of Etruscans, Samnites, and Gauls in the epic battle of Sentinum.

Rullianus' son was Quintus Fabius Maximus Gurges, and his grandson or great-grandson the Quintus Fabius Maximus Verrucosus, surnamed "Cunctator", of the Second Punic War.

Although Rullianus' fame is undoubted, the main source of his life is Livy, who in turn worked from annals by Fabius Pictor and others, and many of the details are suspiciously similar to stories of the Cunctator.

The agnomen (actually more likely an extra cognomen) "Rullus" appears to mean "uncultivated, boorish" or "beggar".

See also
 Livy (books 8-11 passim)
 Diodorus Siculus
 Valerius Maximus
 Frontinus

References 

4th-century BC Roman consuls
3rd-century BC Roman consuls
Ancient Roman dictators
Ancient Roman generals
Roman censors
Magistri equitum (Roman Republic)
Quintus
4th-century BC births
3rd-century BC deaths